The 2010 Abu Dhabi Grand Prix (formally the 2010 Formula 1 Etihad Airways Abu Dhabi Grand Prix) was a Formula One motor race held on 14 November 2010 at the Yas Marina Circuit on Yas Island, an island on the outskirts of Abu Dhabi in the United Arab Emirates. It was the nineteenth and final round of the 2010 Formula One season. The 55-lap race was won by Red Bull driver Sebastian Vettel after starting from pole position. Lewis Hamilton finished second in a McLaren, and teammate Jenson Button completed the podium, in third place.

Button's third place allowed him to finish fifth in the championship standings, having been eliminated from championship contention at the previous race in Brazil.

Due to injuries sustained in a rally crash prior to the 2011 Formula One season, this was the last Formula One race for Robert Kubica until the 2019 Australian Grand Prix. This was also the last Grand Prix for Lucas di Grassi and Christian Klien.

Report

Background
Heading into the final race of the season, Ferrari driver Fernando Alonso was leading the Drivers' Championship with 246 points; Red Bull drivers Mark Webber and Sebastian Vettel were second and third on 238 points and 231 points respectively. McLaren's Lewis Hamilton was also in mathematical contention on 222 points, 24 behind Alonso with a maximum of 25 points available for the final race. As a result, this was the first occasion that four drivers still had a chance of winning the Drivers' Championship at the final event of the season. In the Constructors' Championship, Red Bull Racing had already secured their first championship title with a total of 469 points, 48 clear of second-placed McLaren with a maximum of 43 points available. McLaren were themselves not confirmed in second place in the championship, with a 32-point advantage over Ferrari.

During that race, Ferrari had used radio transmissions to organize for Fernando Alonso to overtake teammate Felipe Massa for the race victory and gain seven extra points towards the Drivers' Championship. Team owner Dietrich Mateschitz and team principal Christian Horner both stated that Red Bull would not impose any team orders in order to benefit one of its drivers in a bid to stop Alonso from winning the championship. Sebastian Vettel himself had stated that he would help his teammate win the championship if required, having trailed Mark Webber by seven points heading into the weekend.

Practice and qualifying

Three practice sessions were held before the race; the first on Friday afternoon and the second on Friday evening. Both sessions lasted 90 minutes. The third session was held on Saturday afternoon and lasted an hour. All three sessions were held in dry conditions, although the first session was held on a damp but drying track after a pre-session downpour which had not been anticipated. Vettel was quickest with a time of 1:42.760 in the first session, just over six-tenths of a second faster than Hamilton. Button was another four-tenths off Hamilton's pace, followed by Webber, Robert Kubica, and Alonso. Michael Schumacher was seventh, the only other driver to be within 1.5 seconds of Vettel's time. In the second practice session, Hamilton was fastest with a time of 1:40.888, around a quarter of a second quicker than second-placed Vettel. Alonso took third place, ahead of Webber, Kubica and Felipe Massa. Schumacher was only quick enough for eleventh position in the session, marginally slower than his Mercedes teammate Nico Rosberg. Vettel was again quickest, posting a time of 1:40.696, narrowly faster than teammate Webber. Hamilton, Alonso, Button and Vitaly Petrov rounded out the top six positions.

The qualifying session held on Saturday evening was split into three parts. The first part ran for 20 minutes and eliminated the cars from qualifying that finished the session 18th or lower. The second part of qualifying lasted 15 minutes and eliminated cars that finished in positions 11 to 17. The final part of qualifying determined the positions from first to tenth, and decided pole position. Cars which competed in the final session of qualifying were not allowed to change tyres before the race, and as such started the race on the tyres that they set their quickest lap on.

Vettel clinched his tenth pole position for the season, with a time of 1:39.394. As a result, Vettel became only the seventh driver to record ten pole positions in a season, and took his team's 15th pole of the season, equalling McLaren's tally from the  season. He was joined on the front row of the grid by Hamilton. Alonso qualified third, though he was happy with his grid position having outqualified Webber. Button qualified fourth, four-tenths of a second behind Vettel, and Webber qualified fifth. Massa, Rubens Barrichello, Schumacher, Rosberg and Petrov rounded out the top ten. Kubica only managed 11th – missing out on the top ten for the only time in  – having struggled with overall grip in the session. Kamui Kobayashi was best of the Saubers in 12th, ahead of the German trio of Adrian Sutil, Nick Heidfeld and Nico Hülkenberg, with Vitantonio Liuzzi qualifying 16th. The rest of the grid was made up by the Toro Rossos, the Lotuses, the Virgins and the Hispanias.

Race

The race's formation lap commenced at 17:00 local time (UTC+4), with all 24 drivers getting away cleanly. Vettel retained his pole position lead into the first corner, followed by Hamilton, with Button moving into third after Alonso made a slow start. At turn six, Schumacher tried to pass teammate Rosberg around the outside, while battling for eighth position. Schumacher spun his Mercedes, which meant he faced the rest of the oncoming field on track and was collected by Liuzzi, causing both drivers to retire on the spot and the safety car to be deployed. In order to aid any losses that a pit stop may have cost under normal racing conditions, six drivers – Rosberg, Petrov, Jaime Alguersuari, Bruno Senna, Lucas di Grassi and Christian Klien – made pit stops at the end of lap one, and rejoined the circuit between 17th and 22nd. Racing resumed at the end of lap five when the safety car pulled into the pit-lane. The top five remained static until the end of lap eleven.

Webber – who brushed the armco with the right-hand side of his car three laps previously – pitted after struggling for grip on the super-soft, option tyres. He rejoined the circuit 16th, and behind the early-stopping trio of Rosberg, Petrov and Alguersuari. Four laps later, Alonso also brushed the Turn 19 barrier before pitting. He rejoined just in front of Webber, who had moved up the field steadily, and was running 13th – and set the race's fastest lap at the time – by the time Alonso pitted. Vettel and Hamilton continued to set quicker lap times than their championship rivals, despite being on heavily worn option tyres compared to the fresher, hard tyres of Alonso and Webber. That pairing caught up with Petrov towards the end of lap 18, a battle that would go on until the race's conclusion, with the Renault driver having already stopped for tyres. Five laps later, Alonso tried to overtake Petrov under braking for Turn 11 but had to back out of the manoeuvre, narrowly avoiding the back of the Renault. On the same lap, Hamilton pitted from second place. Vettel pitted from the lead on the next lap, and rejoined the circuit comfortably ahead of Hamilton, but in second place behind Button, who had still to stop on track. Hamilton had filtered back into the race in fifth position, behind Kubica and Kobayashi who were running similar strategies to Button out front. After passing Kobayashi, Hamilton closed in behind Kubica but found it hard to pass the Renault, akin to what Alonso had been suffering behind Petrov. Despite having nearly 40 laps on the harder tyre, Kubica's pace was still of a substantial level to hold off the advances of Hamilton.

Button pitted on lap 39 to release Vettel back into the lead, holding a lead of nearly twelve seconds over Kubica. Button rejoined in fourth place behind Kubica and Hamilton, with Kubica ever increasing his margin over Petrov and Alonso, who were running inside the points again in seventh and eighth respectively. Kubica finally pitted on lap 46 from second place, and came back on track in sixth place, crucially ahead of teammate Petrov, Alonso and Webber; the latter pair seeing their championship chances dwindling with every passing lap. In clean air, Hamilton set the race's fastest lap on lap 47 – 1:41.274 – as he closed slightly on Vettel. No further passing attempts were made on track, and thus, Vettel led the race to the end, to take his fifth win of the season. The McLarens of Hamilton and Button completed the podium ahead of Rosberg, the Renaults of Kubica and Petrov, Alonso and Webber. Rounding out the points were Alguersuari and Massa, the Ferrari driver having never got ahead of his rival in 40 laps of battling. His championship-winning margin was four points over Alonso; whom he would go ahead and replace in future at Ferrari, with Webber a further ten points behind in third.

Post-race

The top three finishers appeared on the podium and in the subsequent press conference. Vettel's victory had left him "speechless", and expressed his delight at winning the Championship. He also stated:

Hamilton praised his team for all their work during the season, stating that "we pushed very hard throughout the year, so a big thank to all the guys back home at the factory for not giving up. Next year will be a better year." Button echoed Hamilton's comments about the work of his McLaren team, and summed up his first season with the team: "I would like to say a big thank you to the team. This is my first year with the team and I have had a great season. I really feel at home and I think the experiences we have gained this year, Lewis and myself, with working closely with the engineers and everyone in the Vodafone McLaren Mercedes team means we can really build on this season for next year."

Classification

Qualifying

Race classification 

  – Jarno Trulli retired from the race, but was classified as he completed more than 90% of the race distance.

Championship standings after the race

Drivers' Championship standings

Constructors' Championship standings

 Note: Only the top five positions are included for both sets of standings.
 Bold text indicates the 2010 World Champions.

See also 
 2010 Yas Marina GP2 Series round

References

External links

Abu Dhabi
Abu Dhabi Grand Prix
Grand Prix
Abu Dhabi Grand Prix